Catching the Wolf of Wall Street: More Incredible True Stories of Fortunes, Schemes, Parties, and Prison is the second non-fiction book by former stockbroker and trader Jordan Belfort. The text was initially published on February 24, 2009 by Bantam Books.

Overview 
The first book, The Wolf of Wall Street, explores his epic rise and fall in the financial world. The second memoir describes Belfort's life and events after his arrest. The sale of the rights to cinematize these two books is estimated to have earned Belfort some $2 million.

Similar books
Great Salad Oil Swindle by Norman Charles Miller
Octopus by Guy Lawson
Rogue Trader by Nick Leeson

References

External links

Books about traders
2009 non-fiction books